Guzmán el Bueno is a station on Line 6 and Line 7 of the Madrid Metro located underneath the Avenida de la Reina Victoria between the neighborhoods of Vallehermoso in Chamberí district and Ciudad Universitaria in Moncloa-Aravaca district in Madrid. It is in fare Zone A. The station was named after the medieval Spanish nobleman Alonso Pérez de Guzmán, known as Guzmán el Bueno ("Guzmán the Good").

History 
The station opened on 13 January 1987 when Line 6 was extended from Cuatro Caminos to Ciudad Universitaria. At the time, it was one of the deepest stations in the network, at some  beneath the surface. The platforms feature tile mosaics of towers and swords, referencing the historical figure Guzmán el Bueno. On 12 February 1999, the Line 7 platforms were inaugurated as part of an extension of the line from Canal to Valdezarza. At the same time, elevators were installed, making the station accessible.

References 

Line 6 (Madrid Metro) stations
Line 7 (Madrid Metro) stations
Railway stations in Spain opened in 1987
Buildings and structures in Vallehermoso neighborhood, Madrid